Kōfuku-ji or Tōmeizan Kōfuku-ji (Tōmeizan Kōfuku-ji) is a Buddhist temple of the Ōbaku school of Zen established in 1624 in Nagasaki, Japan. It is an important cultural asset designated by the government.

Its Mazu Hall (Masu-do) or Bodhisattva Hall (Bosa-do) is one of the few temples located in Japan of the Chinese sea goddess known as Mazu, the deified form of the medieval Fujianese shamaness Lin Moniang.

Gallery

References

External links
 . & 
 "Kōfuku-ji" at Nagasaki University 
 "Toumeizan Koufukuji" 

Buddhist temples in Nagasaki Prefecture
Buildings and structures in Nagasaki
Obaku temples
1624 in Japan
Buildings and structures completed in 1624
Mazu temples